HR 4180 is a double star with components HD 92449 and HD 92463 in the southern constellation of Vela. They are probably members of a binary star system. HR 4180 can be viewed with the naked eye, having an apparent visual magnitude of 4.29. The system is moving further from the Earth with a heliocentric radial velocity of +20 km/s.

The primary component of this system, HD 92449, is a bright giant with a stellar classification  of G5 IIa. The star radiates 1,370 times the Sun's luminosity from its photosphere at an effective temperature of 5,100 K. It shares a common proper motion with the magnitude 6.06 star HD 92463, and the pair likely form a binary system. This secondary component is a B-type main-sequence star with a class of B8 V. As of 2000, it had an angular separation of  along a position angle of 105° from the primary.

References

G-type bright giants
B-type main-sequence stars
Binary stars
Vela (constellation)
Velorum, x
Durchmusterung objects
092449
052154
4180